Eder Baù (born 16 August 1982 in Asiago) is an Italian footballer who plays as a striker.

Career
Baù started his career at A.C. Milan. He was loaned to Triestina in Serie C1 in the summer of 2001. Following Triestina's promotion to Serie B, the club bought half of his license for 200 million lire and later acquired his full license in summer 2005. He played over 100 games for Triestina, but in January 2006, he was loaned to Pescara with an option to obtain half of the player's license. On 7 July 2006, Triestina sold half of Baù's registration rights to newly promoted side Spezia, and the other half to Pescara. Baù failed to score and was loaned to another relegation struggler, Serie B side F.C. Crotone.

After Spezia won the relegation playoffs and remained in Serie B, Spezia bought the newly relegated Pescara's half of the player for €30,000.

Baù played once for Spezia during the 2007–08 season before half of his license was sold to Padova of Serie C1. In September 2009, he terminated his contract with the club one year early. He then played for Pro Patria and Serie D team Trento.

References

External links
http://aic.football.it/scheda/3708/bau-eder.htm

1982 births
Living people
People from Asiago
Italian footballers
A.C. Milan players
U.S. Triestina Calcio 1918 players
Delfino Pescara 1936 players
Spezia Calcio players
F.C. Crotone players
Calcio Padova players
A.C. Trento 1921 players
Association football forwards
Sportspeople from the Province of Vicenza
Footballers from Veneto